The Ohlson baronetcy, of Scarborough in the North Riding of the County of York, is a title in the Baronetage of the United Kingdom. It was created on 24 January 1920 for Sir Erik Ohlson, a Swedish-born shipping magnate and coal and timber merchant.

Ohlson baronets, of Scarborough (1920)
Sir Erik Olof Ohlson, 1st Baronet (1873–1934)
Sir Eric James Ohlson, 2nd Baronet (1911–1983)
Sir Brian Eric Christopher Ohlson, 3rd Baronet (1936–2017)
Sir Peter Michael Ohlson, 4th Baronet (born 1939).
The heir presumptive is the present holder's cousin Christopher Mark Ohlson (born 1944).

References

Kidd, Charles, Williamson, David (editors). Debrett's Peerage and Baronetage (1990 edition). New York: St Martin's Press, 1990.

Baronetcies in the Baronetage of the United Kingdom
Scarborough, North Yorkshire